Blastobasis ponticella is a moth in the family Blastobasidae. It is found in the north-western Caucasus, Transcaucasia, Crimea and the southern part of European Russia.

References

Moths described in 2007
Blastobasis
Moths of Europe